= Rajendra Jain =

Member of Parliament, Rajya Sabha
- Incumbent
- Assumed office 2026
- Constituency: Maharastra

Personal details
- Party: Nationalist Congress Party

Rajendra Hiralal Jain is an Indian politician. He was elected to the Rajya Sabha from Maharastra as a member of the Nationalist Congress Party.
